Cellana radians, common name the radiate limpet, is a species of true limpet, a marine gastropod mollusc in the family Nacellidae, which is one of the true limpet families.

Description
The foot and the head are lightly colored whereas Cellana flava has darker colored soft tissues. The shell exhibits different morphological varieties, even in the same location. The shell can be grayish white on the outside with rather flat ribs that are somewhat darker. Its interior is iridescent and white, with gray muscle impressions. The apex is off-center and sometimes worn off.

Ecology
Cellana radians is found on rocks and other hard substrates in the littoral and sublittoral zones of the seas around New Zealand.

References

 Nakano T. & Ozawa T. (2007). Worldwide phylogeography of limpets of the order Patellogastropoda: molecular, morphological and paleontological evidence. Journal of Molluscan Studies 73(1): 79–99
 Bruce A. Marshall, Molluscan and brachiopod taxa introduced by F. W. Hutton in The New Zealand journal of science; Journal of the Royal Society of New Zealand, Volume 25, Issue 4, 1995

Nacellidae
Gastropods of New Zealand
Gastropods described in 1791
Taxa named by Johann Friedrich Gmelin